Tamjanika, Temjanika or Tamyanka is a type of grape, a variety of Muscat Blanc à Petits Grains, grown in Serbia, North Macedonia and Bulgaria. It is named after tamjan ("frankincense"), due to intense scent from ripe grapes, which can be sensed several metres away. Berries are small, very dark purple, almost perfect balls. It ripens in mid September. 

Tamjanika is used to produce white wines of intense fruit aroma and taste. It has characteristic Muscat notes of cinnamon, elder plant, basil, pineapple and strawberry. Red Tamjanika is a rarity, but of exceptional quality.

References
 
 

White wine grape varieties
Grape varieties of Serbia
Macedonian wine
Bulgarian wine